The German International School Toronto (GIST) is a German private school in Toronto, Ontario. The school offers grades from Pre-Kindergarten through Grade 8.

Campus

In August 2020, the school moved to its new location on 25 Burnhamthorpe Rd in Etobicoke, renting from the Islington United Church.

See also
 Canadians of German ethnicity

References

External links
 German International School Toronto
  German International School Toronto

International schools in Toronto
Toronto